Pandit Chhannulal Mishra (born 3 August 1936) is a celebrated Hindustani classical singer from Banaras, a noted exponent of the Kirana gharana (school) of the Hindustani classical music and especially the Khayal and the 'Purab Ang' – Thumri.

He has won 'Shiromani Award' of Sur Singar Sansad, Bombay; Uttar Pradesh Sangeet Natak Akademi Award; Naushad Award of U.P. Govt; Yash Bharti Award of U.P; Sangeet Natak Academy fellowship by Government of India and the Bihar Sangeet Shiromani Award. He was awarded the Padma Bhushan, India's third highest civilian honour, on 25 January 2010. He was  awarded the  Padma Vibhushan India's second highest civilian award in 2020.

Personal Life 

Mishra ji is the son-in law of the late Pt Anokhelal Mishra.

Biography
Mishra was born on 3 August 1936 in Hariharpur, Azamgarh district of Uttar Pradesh, in the home of Badri Prasad Mishra. 
He first learnt music with his father, Badri Prasad Mishra, and was then was educated by 'Ustad Abdul Ghani Khan' of the Kirana gharana. He was trained thereafter by Thakur Jaidev Singh.

Discography

Audio releases

 Ramcharitmanas - Album containing 6 tracks sung about Shri Ram's life journey / story. Literally means the heart of the character of Shri Ram

 Anjali (Hindi: अंजलि, literally Offering) – Audio CD with 10 tracks which include four Stutis, two Shlokas, two Chalisas, one Stotra and one Vandana dedicated to various aspects of Shakti – Durga, Mahakali, Kali, Saraswati, Vindhyeshwari, Sitala, Ganga, Bhavani.   
 Echoes of Banaras Volume 3 – Audio CD with three Thumris, one Sawani and one Chaiti.
 Holi Ke Rang – Tesu Ke Phool (Hindi: होली के रंग – टेसू के फूल, literally The colours of Holi, the flowers of Tesu) – Audio CD with eight songs on Holi, seven describing the Holi of Radha and Krishna and one describing the Holi of Parvati and Shiva .
 Kabir (Hindi: कबीर) – A set of two audio CDs with 12 Bhajans authored by Kabir, a middle-age mystic from Benares. 
 Krishna Madhav (Hindi: कृष्ण माधव) – A set of two audio CDs with 12 Bhajans dedicated to Krishna.
 Purvaiya – Chaiti (Hindi: पुरवइया – चैती, literally From the Orient – Songs of Chaitra) – Audio CD with nine songs of the Chaiti genre which are traditionally sung in the Hindu month of Chaitra (March–April) which falls during spring.
 Purvaiya – Kajari (Hindi: पुरवइया – कजरी, literally From the Orient – Songs of Rain) – Audio CD with eight songs of the Kajari genre which are traditionally sung during the rainy season.
 Rama Raga (Hindi: राम राग, literally The Raga of Rama) – Audio CD with a one-hour rendition of the three words Raja (King), Rama and Raga in various Ragas.
 Tulsidas – Ramcharitmanas (Hindi: तुलसीदास – रामचरितमानस) – Audio CD with five excerpts from the Ramcharitmanas of Tulsidas in different Ragas.
 Shiv Vivah (Hindi: शिव विवाह, literally The marriage of Shiva) – Audio CD with the marriage of Parvati and Shiva from the Ramcharitmanas of Tulsidas sung in eleven different Ragas, along with four Bhajans dedicated to Shiva.
 Spirit Of Benares – Audio CD with two Khayals, two Thumris and two Dadaras.
 Krishna – From The Heart Of Benaras – Audio CD with nine songs dedicated to Krishna.
 Sundar Kand (Hindi: सुन्दरकाण्ड) – A set of four audio CDs with the entire Sundar Kand of the Ramcharitmanas of Tulsidas sung in different Ragas, along with two Bhajans dedicated to Hanuman.
 Music from the living room  - Pt Channulal Mishra
 Makar Records MAKCD027 The Lyrical Tradition of Khyal 8 - Pandit Channulal Mishra.

Bollywood songs
Aarakshan (Hindi: आरक्षण) (2011) – Two songs, Kaun Si Dor with Shreya Ghoshal and Saans Albeli.
''Mohalla Assi -Title track

References

External links
 Official Site of Chhannulal Mishra

1936 births
Living people
Hindustani singers
Recipients of the Padma Bhushan in arts
Thumri
20th-century Indian male classical singers
Bhajan singers
Kirana gharana
Musicians from Varanasi
Singers from Uttar Pradesh
21st-century Indian male classical singers
Recipients of the Padma Vibhushan in arts
Recipients of the Sangeet Natak Akademi Fellowship
Recipients of the Sangeet Natak Akademi Award